Club de Deportes Tocopilla is a Chilean Football club, currently their home town is Tocopilla, Antofagasta Region.

The club were founded on March 27, 2006 and participated for 3 years in Chilean Tercera División, 1 year in Chilean Cuarta División and 3 seasons in Torneo Afunor.

Seasons played
3 seasons in Tercera División
1 season in Cuarta División
3 seasons in Torneo Afunor

See also
Chilean football league system

Tocopilla
Deportes Tocopilla
2006 establishments in Chile